Moon trees are trees grown from seeds taken into orbit around the Moon, initially by Apollo 14 in 1971, and later by Artemis 1 in 2022. The idea was first proposed by Edward P. Cliff, then the Chief of the United States Forest Service, who convinced Stuart Roosa, the Command Module Pilot on the Apollo 14 mission, to bring a small canister containing about 500 seeds aboard the module in 1971. Seeds for the experiment were chosen from five species of tree: loblolly pine, sycamore, sweetgum, redwood, and Douglas fir. In 2022, NASA announced it would be reviving the moon tree program by carrying 1,000 seeds aboard Artemis 1.

History 
After the flight, the seeds were sent to the southern Forest Service station in Gulfport, Mississippi, and to the western station in Placerville, California, with the intent to germinate them. Nearly all the seeds germinated successfully, and after a few years, the Forest Service had about 420 seedlings. Some of these were planted alongside their Earth-bound counterparts, which were specifically set aside as controls. After more than 40 years, there was no discernible difference between the two classes of trees. Most of the "Moon trees" were given away in 1975 and 1976 to state forestry organizations, in order to be planted as part of the nation's bicentennial celebration. Since the trees were all of southern or western species, not all states received trees. A Loblolly Pine was planted at the White House, and trees were planted in Brazil, Switzerland, and presented to Emperor Hirohito, among others.

The locations of many of the trees that were planted from these seeds were largely unknown for decades. In 1996, a third-grade teacher, Joan Goble, and her students found a tree in their local area with a plaque identifying it as a moon tree. Goble sent an email to NASA, and reached employee Dave Williams. Williams was unaware of the trees' existence, as were most of his colleagues at NASA. Upon doing some research, Williams found some old newspaper clippings that described the initial actions taken by Roosa to bring these seeds to space and home to be planted.
Williams posted a page on NASA's official website asking for public help to find the trees. The page also contained a table listing the locations and species of known moon trees. Williams began to hear from people around the United States who had seen trees with plaques identifying them as moon trees. Williams began to manage a database listing details about such trees, including their location and species. In 2011, an article in Wired magazine described the effort, and provided Williams' email address, encouraging anyone to write who might have data on existing moon trees. As of 2022, efforts were continuing to identify and locate existing trees; the NASA page remains active.

In March 2021, the Royal Astronomical Society and the UK Space Agency asked for the help of the public to identify up to 15 Moon Trees that may be growing in the United Kingdom. As of April 2021, none of the trees that supposedly came to the UK have been identified.

Current efforts
The Moon Tree Foundation is an organization run by Roosa's daughter, Rosemary, which seeks to plant moon trees in regions around the world. The foundation sponsors and hosts ceremonies to plant new trees, with seeds produced by the original generation of trees that grew from the seeds carried by Roosa.

Locations

United States

Other countries

See also
 Moon rock
 Astrobotany
 List of individual trees

References

External links
 The Moon Trees, NASA Goddard Space Flight Center
 Moon Tree Foundation
 "Houston, We Have Moon Trees". Peeling Back the Bark blog, The Forest History Society.

Tree
Tree
Individual trees
Space-flown life
United States Bicentennial
Stuart Roosa